Hood Army Airfield  is a military airport located at the U.S. Army's Fort Hood, in Killeen, Texas, U.S.

Facilities 
Hood Army Airfield has a single  asphalt runway, identified as 16/34.

The base is also served by Robert Gray Army Airfield  and two asphalt auxiliary landing strips used for training at North Fort Hood:

References

External links 
 

Airfields of the United States Army Air Forces in Texas
Airfield
Transportation in Bell County, Texas
United States Army airfields